Kateřina Urbanová (born 1 June 1984) is a Czech female curler and curling coach.

Teams

Record as a coach of national teams

References

External links

Czech national women team (2012) - Czech Curling Federation (web archive)
Urbanová Kateřina (CC ZBRASLAV) - Player statistics (all games with his/her participation) - Czech Curling Association

Living people
1984 births
Czech female curlers
Czech curling coaches